Ipima Street is a light rail station in Australia on the Canberra Metro R1 Civic to Gungahlin line, located at the intersection of Northbourne Avenue, Ipima Street and Condamine Street. It is one of two stations serving the suburbs of Turner and Braddon and sits outside a large student accommodation complex (formerly Fenner Hall, historically linked to the Australian National University). Bicycle racks are provided for commuters adjacent to the station.

Light rail services
All services in both directions stop at Ipima Street. Interchange with local ACTION bus routes is not possible at this station.

References

Light rail stations in Canberra
Railway stations in Australia opened in 2019